Emily McVarish (born 1965) is an American writer, designer, book artist and professor at California College of the Arts. She lives and works in San Francisco and her work primarily takes the form of books. Clifton Meador says "she uses the form of the book to explore things that cannot be explored any other way".

McVarish's books are die-cut, handset, printed, and bound. Her book Quickstead was selected as the Alastair Johnston Award Winner in 2014.

Her work is held by  the San Francisco Museum of Modern Art’s artist's book collection, British Library’s American Collections and Harvard University’s Printing and Graphic Arts Collection.

Her work has been exhibited at  Lesley University in Cambridge the Center for Book Arts in New York, and the San Francisco Public Library

Bibliography
 With Johanna Drucker Graphic Design History  Pearson 2012 
 With Johanna Drucker MySearchLab Pearson 2012 
 Quickstead Granary Books, 2011–2013. Edition of 45
  A Thousand Several Granary Books (2011)
 The Square Granary Books (2009)
 Was Here Granary Books (2001)
 From the air E. McVarish (2000)
 At the wheel Granary Books (1997)
 Felicity Letterpress (1993) Edition of 50.

References 

California College of the Arts faculty
American women artists
1965 births
Women book artists
Book artists
Living people
American women academics
21st-century American women